The True Deceiver (1982; Swedish: , lit. "The Honest Deceiver") is a novel by Finnish-Swedish author Tove Jansson. It was translated into English by Thomas Teal and won the Best Translated Book Award in 2011.

The novel was first published in 1982 by Schildts Förlags Ab, Finland. The English translation was first published in the UK by Sort of Books, then in the US through NYRB Classics, an imprint of The New York Review of Books.

Summary 
"Snow has been falling on the village all winter long. It covers windows and piles up in front of doors. The sun rises late and sets early, and even during the day there is little to do but trade tales. This year everybody’s talking about Katri Kling and Anna Aemelin. Katri is a yellow-eyed outcast who lives with her simpleminded brother and a dog she refuses to name. She has no use for the white lies that smooth social intercourse, and she can see straight to the core of any problem. Anna, an elderly children’s book illustrator, appears to be Katri’s opposite: a respected member of the village, if an aloof one. Anna lives in a large empty house, venturing out in the spring to paint exquisitely detailed forest scenes. But Anna has something Katri wants, and to get it Katri will take control of Anna’s life and livelihood. By the time spring arrives, the two women are caught in a conflict of ideals that threatens to strip them of their most cherished illusions."

Themes 
From the back matter: "Deception—the lies we tell ourselves and the lies we tell others [...] solitude and community, art and life, love and hate."

Editions 
The True Deceiver, NYRB Classics. Accessed 11 May 2010.

References

1982 novels
20th-century Finnish novels
Swedish-language novels